Stone Bridge crosses Bull Run at the eastern entrance of the Manassas National Battlefield Park in Prince William County, Virginia. The original bridge, built in 1825, was destroyed when Confederate forces evacuated Northern Virginia in March, 1862. In 1884, a new bridge, apparently similar to the original design, was built on the site of the old bridge. Modern day U.S. Route 29 crosses Bull Run on a bridge built in the late 1960s downstream of this one.

See also
List of bridges documented by the Historic American Engineering Record in Virginia

References

External links

1825 establishments in Virginia
Bridges completed in 1825
Bridges completed in 1884
Buildings and structures in Manassas, Virginia
Demolished buildings and structures in Virginia
Historic American Engineering Record in Virginia
Manassas National Battlefield Park
Road bridges in Virginia
Stone arch bridges in the United States